The Cameroon International is an international badminton tournament held in Yaoundé, Cameroon. This tournament established in 2017 and part of the Badminton Confederation of Africa Circuit.

Past winners

Performances by countries

References

External links 

Badminton in Cameroon
2017 establishments